Pasta al pomodoro is an Italian food typically prepared with pasta, olive oil, fresh tomatoes, basil, and various other fresh ingredients. It is intended to be a quick and light dish, rather than a dish in a heavy sauce.

Pomodoro means "tomato" in Italian.

See also
Spaghetti alla puttanesca
 List of pasta dishes
 List of tomato dishes

References

Italian cuisine
Pasta dishes
Tomato dishes